Chloroclystis rotundaria is a moth in the family Geometridae. It was described by Charles Swinhoe in 1902. It is found on New Guinea.

References

External links

Moths described in 1902
rotundaria
Endemic fauna of New Guinea
Taxa named by Charles Swinhoe